Rockwood is an unincorporated community located in the town of Kossuth, Manitowoc County, Wisconsin, United States. U.S. Route 141 passed through the community before it was decommissioned in 1981 after being replaced by Interstate 43 as the major route between Green Bay and Milwaukee. US 141 was renamed as County R.

Points of Interest
Devil's River State Trail

Images

References

Unincorporated communities in Manitowoc County, Wisconsin
Unincorporated communities in Wisconsin